The Caller is a 2008 film by Richard Ledes. The film, which stars Frank Langella, Elliott Gould, and Laura Harring, premiered at the Tribeca Film Festival where it won the Made in NY Narrative Award. The screenplay was co-authored with Alain Didier-Weill.

Plot
Jimmy Stevens (Frank Langella) is a high level executive at an international energy consulting firm. Haunted by the criminal practices of his company, he decides to expose their corruption. He realizes this betrayal will lead to his murder, so he hires out a detective to trail him during his last days.

Unaware that the man who has hired him and the man he is following are one and the same, Turlotte (Elliott Gould) begins a thrilling game of cat and mouse with Stevens and New York City becomes the arena for the uncertain contest. Slowly, the investigation begins to yield clues that come to reveal the larger story of Jimmy's mysterious past. 
 
As hints of his childhood in occupied France during World War II are unearthed, a haunting memory surrounding a lone, dying man and the two young boys who witness his last breath becomes the key to the present. As the clock winds down and the hired guns close in on Jimmy, Turlotte puts the puzzle pieces together with just enough time to fulfill his fated duty.

Cast
 Frank Langella as Jimmy Stevens
 Elliott Gould as Frank Turlotte
 Laura Harring as Eileen
 Corey Johnson as Paul Winsail
 Edoardo Ballerini as Teddy
 Helen Stenborg as Jimmy's mother

Reception
As of June 2014, the film had a score of 13% on Rotten Tomatoes from 16 reviews. The New York Post gave it a critical review calling it an "opaque oddity" and suggesting it only received a theatrical release because of Frank Langella's Oscar nomination. Time Out New York gave it 2 stars. Screen International called it "ponderous".

References

External links
 

2008 films
Films directed by Richard Ledes
American independent films
2000s thriller films
Films set in New York City
2008 independent films
2000s English-language films
2000s American films